Auburn Sports Arena was a 2,500 seat multi-purpose arena in Auburn, Alabama.  Nicknamed "The Barn," it opened in 1946.  It was home to the Auburn University Tigers basketball team.  It was replaced when the Beard–Eaves–Memorial Coliseum opened in 1968.

After it closed, it continued to host Auburn's women's gymnastics team.

In 1996, the Auburn Sports Arena was destroyed by a fire that occurred during the Auburn-LSU football game.  The fire was likely started by the embers of a tailgater's grill.

The site has since been replaced with a parking deck.

References

Auburn Tigers basketball venues
Basketball venues in Alabama
Defunct college basketball venues in the United States
Defunct indoor arenas in the United States
Defunct sports venues in Alabama
Indoor arenas in Alabama
1946 establishments in Alabama
Sports venues completed in 1946
1996 disestablishments in Alabama
Sports venues demolished in 1996